This is a list of bridges and other crossings of the James River in the U.S. state of Virginia, from the Chesapeake Bay upstream to its source.

Crossings

See also

References

{www.dhr.Virginia.gov/highway-markers/}

James River (Virginia)
Crossings